Pamela Vásquez (born March 10, 1981) is a Honduran former swimmer, who specialized in middle-distance freestyle events. Vasquez competed only in the women's 200 m freestyle at the 2000 Summer Olympics in Sydney. She received a ticket from FINA, under a Universality program, in an entry time of 2:12.87. She participated in heat one against two other swimmers Nisha Millet of India and Marella Mamoun of Syrian Arab Republic. She raced to the second seed in a time of 2:15.83, trailing behind leader Millet by almost seven seconds. Vasquez failed to advance into the semifinals, as she placed thirty-eighth overall in the prelims.

References

1981 births
Living people
Honduran female swimmers
Olympic swimmers of Honduras
Swimmers at the 1999 Pan American Games
Swimmers at the 2000 Summer Olympics
Pan American Games competitors for Honduras
Honduran female freestyle swimmers